This is a list of Australian films of the 1940s. For a complete alphabetical list, see :Category:Australian films.

1940s

See also
 1940 in Australia
 1941 in Australia
 1942 in Australia
 1943 in Australia
 1944 in Australia
 1945 in Australia
 1946 in Australia
 1947 in Australia
 1948 in Australia
 1949 in Australia

External links
 Australian film at the Internet Movie Database

 
 
1940s
Australian
Films